USS Stockdale (DDG-106) is an  guided missile destroyer in the United States Navy. The third U.S. Navy ship of that name, Stockdale is named after Vice Admiral James Bond Stockdale (1923–2005) and is the 56th destroyer in her class. She was authorized on 13 September 2002 and was built by Bath Iron Works. Stockdale was christened 10 May 2008 by Admiral Stockdale's widow, Sybil, and delivered to the Navy on 30 September 2008. She transited the Panama Canal in March 2009; Admiral Stockdale's youngest son and grandchildren joined the ship for the trip. USS Stockdale was commissioned on 18 April 2009 at Port Hueneme.

Ship history
From November 2010 to July 2011, Stockdale performed an eight-month deployment in the United States Seventh Fleet Area of Responsibility. She made ports of call at Guam, Sepangar, Malaysia; Sihanoukville, Cambodia; Laem Chabang, Thailand; Singapore, and Chinhae, South Korea.

In July 2012, Stockdale participated in the naval exercise RIMPAC 2012. This included maneuvers in the Kaulakahi Channel (between Kauai and Niihau Islands, Hawaii) near the PMRF.

USS Stockdale departed San Diego in July 2021 and joined Carrier Strike Group One. Stockdale’s sonar dome was damaged while underway, on 21 January 2022 and repairs were made in Yokosuka. After the damages were repaired, Stockdale began its journey home and arrived at San Diego on 15 July 2022.

Awards

Navy E Ribbon - (2010, 2015)
Navy Expeditionary Medal - (Sep-Nov 2013)
National Defense Service Medal - (2009)
Global War on Terrorism Service Medal - (2009)
Sea Service Deployment Ribbon

Deployments
 30 November 2010 – 22 July 2011 Maiden deployment
 24 January 2013 – 8 November 2013 WESTPAC
 20 January 2016 – 29 August 2016 
20 October 2018 - 20 May 2019

7th Fleet Deployment, part of the "Great Green Fleet"

References

External links

navsource.org: USS Stockdale
Stockdale Official Homepage

 

Arleigh Burke-class destroyers
Ships built in Bath, Maine
2008 ships
Carrier Strike Group One